This is a list of the 6 members of the European Parliament for Luxembourg in the 1994 to 1999 session.

List

Party representation

Notes

Luxembourg 1994-1999
List
1994